The Francophonie is the population that speak French. The term designates the ensemble of people, organisations and governments that share the use of French on a daily basis and as administrative language, teaching language or chosen language. The term was coined by Onésime Reclus in 1880 and became important as part of the conceptual rethinking of cultures and geography in the late 20th century.

The francophonie can designate the group of countries that speak French, but also all the countries members of the Organisation Internationale de la Francophonie. The term refers to countries that speak partially or fully the French language, and also include countries that do not have French as an official language.

Denominations
Francophonie, francophonie and francophone space are syntagmatic. This expression is relevant to countries which speak French as their national language, may it be as a mother language or a secondary language. 

These expressions are sometimes misunderstood or misused by English speakers. They can be synonymous but most of the time they are complementary.
 "francophonie", with a small "f", refers to populations and people who speak French for communication or/and in their daily lives.
 "Francophonie", with a capital "F", can be defined as referring to the governments, governmental and non-governmental organisations or governing officials that share the use of French in their work and exchange.
 "Francophone space", "Francosphere" represents not only a linguistic or geographic reality, but also a cultural entity: for example describing any individual who identifies with one of the francophone cultures, may it be Slavic, Latin, Creole, North American or Oceanian for example.

Origins 
The term francophonie was invented by Onésime Reclus in 1880: "We also put aside four large countries, Senegal, Gabon, Cochinchina and Cambodia, whose future from a "Francophone" point of view is still very doubtful, except perhaps for Senegal" (in French « Nous mettons aussi de côté quatre grands pays, le Sénégal, le Gabon, la Cochinchine, le Cambodge dont l’avenir au point de vue « francophone » est encore très douteux sauf peut-être pour le Sénégal ») ; and then used by geographers.   

During the Third Republic, the French language progressively gained importance.   

The Académie française, a French institution created in 1635 in charge of officially determining and unifying the rules and evolutions of the French language, participated in the promotion and the development of the French language.

See also
 Organisation internationale de la Francophonie
 Agence universitaire de la Francophonie
 Francophone literature
 Institut Français
 Alliance française
 French language in Canada, Lebanon, United States, Minnesota, Vietnam, Laos, and Cambodia
 Swiss, Belgian, and African French
French-based creole languages
 Influence of French on English

References 

 
French language
Country classifications